Zamość, founded in 1580, is a town in Poland.

Renaissance town

Zamość was founded in 1580 by the Chancellor and Hetman (head of the army of the Polish–Lithuanian Commonwealth) Jan Zamoyski, on the trade route linking western and northern Europe with the Black Sea.  Modelled on Italian trading cities, and built during the Baroque period by the architect Bernardo Morando, a native of Padua, Zamość remains a perfect example of a Renaissance town of the late 16th century, which retains its original layout and fortifications (Zamość Fortress), and a large number of buildings blending Italian and central European architectural traditions.

At the turn of the 16th and 17th centuries Zamość was one of the most impressive fortresses in the Polish–Lithuanian Commonwealth. The city was belted with powerful bastion fortifications, curtains and moats. The defensive qualities of the fortress were determined by the natural conditions, since the city was founded at the Łabuńka river and its tributary Topornica river, surrounded by the extensive marshy valley.

As a result of the merger of the fortress and the main city and thanks to the terrain, the fortress had a shape of irregular heptagon, consisting of 7 curtains and 7 bastions placed in the bends. Jan Zamoyski, the founder and owner of the city, paid a lot of attention to the defense functions of the city. In the founding document, he pledged to consolidate the city with ramparts and a moat. The city was founded in the areas that used to be threatened or attacked by the Tatars. In the case of emergency, the powerful fortress could give shelter to people fleeing from threatened areas.

In the 17th century the city was thriving during the most extensive and fastest development period. It attracted not only the Poles but also many other nationalities.
During the times of  the Polish–Lithuanian Commonwealth the city belonged to Krasnystaw county, which was the part of the Red Ruthenia. In 1589 it became the capital of Zamoyski Family Fee Tail. From the very beginning Zamość was the biggest fortes in the eastern borders of the country, therefore it played a big military role.
Zamoyski Family Fee Tail budded immediately and the person responsible for this was the founder of this fortes. It is doubtlessly the evidence of the connection of Poland with the European culture as well as the world culture.
The news about the privileges and the benefits for the settlers made other people to come to the city. Firstly, the privileges were only for the Catholics who settled down in Zamość, however it caused the lack of the newcomers. It wasn't what Zamoyski was hoping for. In order to change that situation in the city on 30 April 1585 Armenians got the permission to settle down in Zamość. The other documents from 26 February 1588 and 10th 1589 also enabled Sephardic Jews and Greeks to settle in the city. The Sephardic Jews got the privilege to live on Szewska street and to build the synagogue. 
In 1589 Zamość became the capital of the city- Zamoyski Family Fee Tail formed by Jan Zamoyski and submitted by the Parliament of the republic of Poland. In 1591 there were 275 houses in Zamość, including 217 buildings in the center, 32 on the Lviv and Lublin suburbs. 
Between years 1580 and 1590 Zamość was a huge construction site: the construction of the palace, arsenal, townhouses, the wooden Holy Cross church was proceeding as well as the earthworks on the fortifications began. 
Zamość played great strategical and economic roles. It was the center of culture and science, mostly thanks to Zamojski Academy and the printery related to it. 
The city, however, faced numerous invasions, including the siege by the Cossacks led by Bohdan Khmelnytsky in 1648, the leader of the uprising against the Polish–Lithuanian Commonwealth (1648–1654), and during the Swedish Deluge in 1656. The Swedish army, like the Cossacks, failed to capture the city. Only during the Great Northern War Zamość was occupied by the Swedish and Saxon troops.

Following the First Partition of Poland, in 1772, the city was annexed by Austria and included within the newly formed Crown Province of Galicia. Following the Austro-Polish War of 1809 the city was incorporated to the Napoleonic Duchy of Warsaw whereas after the fall of Napoleon, following the decisions taken during the Congress of Vienna in 1815, Zamość became a part of the Kingdom of Poland, also called Congress Poland, which was controlled by the Russian Empire.

In 1821 the government of the kingdom bought off the city and modernized the Zamość fortress. As a result, many buildings were restructured losing their original form and style. The modernized fortress played a big role during the November Uprising in 1830-1831 and surrendered as the last Polish resistance point. The fortress was finally destroyed in 1866, giving rise to the robust spatial development of the city.

In 1916 the city was provided with the railway line. After Poland regained its independence in 1918, Zamość witnessed the outbreak of a communist revolt, suppressed by the Polish troops under the command of Major Leopold Lis-Kula. Two years later, during the Polish-Soviet War, the Soviet army surrounded the city but failed to capture it.

The interwar period was a period of fast city development when its boundaries were widened as well as many new institutions and centers, especially those relating to cultural and educational life, were created.

The Ideal city

"Pearl of the Renaissance", "Padua of the North", "City of arcades"–  these were the expressions used to describe Zamość not only because of the single Renaissance architecture monuments, but also because of its original, urban space layout. In Europe there are only two cities, built accordingly with the premises of the so-called "ideal city", one of them is Zamość. The concept of the "ideal city" was not made by the Italian architects of the Renaissance era. The "ideal city" was supposed to be geometric, straight and congruous with its form, which leashed it. The author of the first vision of the city was Plato, who wanted to divide the city into counties, which would be placed in the middle of the city as a central point. However, Hippoadamus of Miletus had a different plan. His idea was that the place would be based on the streets delineated in  perpendicular and parallel lines. That is how Piraeus looks like.

Most of the historic buildings are located in the Old Town. The main distinguishing features of the Old Town have been well preserved since its establishment. It includes the regular Great Market Square of 100 x 100 meters with the splendid Town Hall and so-called Armenian houses, as well as the fragments of the original fortress and fortifications, including those from the period of the Russian occupation in the 19th century.

At the end of the 19th century the Polish Chancellor Jan Zamoyski, the owner of 24 cities and about 800 villages wanted to build the city, which would be his family seat, the impregnable fortes and architecturally imposing place. He commissioned the Italian architect Bernardo Morando to design this city that would be based on the anthropomorphic concept.
The Chancellor Jan founded the construction of the city "from scratch". It was designed and planned in the 15th century, the city however, was never built, and its plans are only on the scheme. Zamość survived until today as one of the unique projects of the Renaissance ideal city.
The essence of the Renaissance and urbanistic plan (based on the "checkerboard scheme"), which was accomplished in Zamość demonstrates the most significant features of the Era, which differ from the composition of the Medieval Era. The plan bases on two intersecting at an acute angle axes, on which two main streets of the city are placed. The main point in this layout is the castle, which is surrounded by a large rectangular area with the size of 166x170m, which is encircled by a castle wall with the entrance gate placed above the axis.
On the region of the axis the Great Market was created with the size of 100x100. In the middle of the market there is a transverse axis of the whole composition, which passes at the right angle. On this axis there are two other symmetric spaces, which are : Salt Square and Water Square, functioning as the "internal organs" of the city whereas the bastions are the "hands and legs" for self-defense. The series of manor houses are placed on the line parallel to the axis. These houses have a homogeneous architecture and create an appropriate background for the architectural forms.

Zamość in not only a great achievement of the Polish Renaissance city planning, but also it may be used as an example for the modern city builders. The main thought is the example of adjusting the concept of the spatial layout to the terrain conditions, the wealth of the program of public buildings, paying attention to the architectural composition in the scale of the city, flexible control of the project and reconciling freedom with discipline.

Main buildings of Zamość

The Cathedral of Lord's Resurrection and St. Thomas the Apostle is one of the most magnificent temples in the Polish early modern architecture. It's the listed building of the biggest historical and artistic value. It was funded by the founder of the city, the Chancellor Jan Zamoyski and designed by his court architect Bernardo Morando in 1587–1598. The decoration works of the vaults, naves and chapels were finished between 1618 and 1639 by Tomasz Zamoyski. The only major alteration took place between 1824 and 1826 many ornaments, including the Zamoyski family’s coat and some elements from inside the church were removed. Presently, the temple has more classicistic presence. 
The cathedral is rather squat. The central nave of the three nave basilica is decorated with magnificent, sculptured entablature. There are 85 rosettes, each featuring a different pattern. They were placed between the trusses of the protruding cornice. Beautiful frames of the windows have the gothic slenderness and are made of a stone. The unique organization of the temple relates to the Italian churches from the 15th and 16th centuries. Inside the temple there are slender columns and high vaults in the aisles, which make the temple look less similar to the basilica system and more like indoor place. Its spatial perspective is entrancing and the noble, straight rhythm of the arcades and columns is beautiful.

The Town Hall, which stands on the grounds of Great Market Square is one of the most popular historical treasures of Zamość. It is one of the most beautiful Town Halls in Poland as well. The square is surrounded by a complex of arcaded houses that were built by the richest Zamość merchants. Its measure is exactly 100 meters in both width and length with the crossing two main axes of the old town. The 600-meter longitudinal axis goes from the east to the west: from Bastion No. 7 to the Zamoyski Palace. The 400-meter crosswise axis goes from the north to the south, linking the Great Market Square with the two smaller market squares: Solny and Wodny. The Town Hall was built by Bernardo Morando in 1591. It shared two main functions representative and commercial. Jerzy Kawe and Andrzej Bem redeveloped the Town Hall in a late Baroque forms. Before 1757 the building with the curved rooms and arcade gate was built. It leaned on the tower and the façade of the Town Hall. Between years 1767-1770 the monumental, double stairs were built. The arcades passing over the lodge were the base of them. In 1770 the tower was decorated with a slated helmet with a cupola and the paintings of Jan Mayer graced  two ballrooms on the floor.

Zamość Academy was established in 1594 by Jan Zamoyski in Zamość. The intention of its founder was to prepare the aristocratic youth for the public duty, basing on the popular school of Jan Sturm in Strasburg. It was also to be the new center of educational life and the Polish and catholic culture on the eastern areas of the Republic of Poland, being at the same time the main connection of the Polish thought with the West. Officially it was opened on 15 March 1595. The academy was the first private school and the 3rd Academy in the Republic of Poland. The edifice of the academy was quadrangular with a yard. It was built between 1639 and 1648 thanks to the foundation of Chancellor Tomasz Zamoyski and the designer Jan Jaroszewicz. This early Baroque building, planned regularly and symmetrically is an outstanding achievement in the field of architecture in the 17th century. Between 1752 and 1765 the edifice of the academy was reconstructed. It imitated the style of late Baroque and Rococo. Jan Andrzej Bem designed it. The difference was that he removed the attics and built an uptown, mansard roof. The look of the academy changed in the first half of the 19th century, when the decorative mantelpieces,  portals, window framings, decorative panels were removed and the arcades on the Town Hall were walled up. However, the characteristic forms of almost identical sizes on each side and the internal yard were preserved.

Renaissance tenement houses

The tenement houses with the arcades are the most characteristic features of architecture of Zamość, which is also called the City of Arcades. Up to 55 tenement houses were preserved in Zamość. This is the biggest number of that kind of buildings in Poland.
The arcades were introduced by the main designer of the city Bernardo Morando. They are present not only on the market square, but also in the cathedral. The arcades have a decorative role there. 
Morando also established the general design of the tenement house. Apart from arcades, attics and wide, horizontal frieze under the windows on the first floor were obligatory.
There had to be a courtyard with the access from the street behind the tenement house.
The sophisticated shapes, lace attics, friezes, decorative windows, sculptures and the variety of colours of the Renaissance tenement houses are the pride of the citizens of Zamość and they amuse the tourists from around the world.
The most beautiful houses surround the Great Market Square. Each of its sides is composed of 8 buildings. The tenement house with the rich, stuccoed decoration, which presents dragons, angels and oriental, floral and animal motifs was built on the right side of the Town Hall by the Armenian merchants, who were brought by Jan Zamoyski 5 years after having started the construction of the city.
The Wilczek House is the closest to the Town Hall. It adjoins Rudomicz House, where the chancellor of the Zamoyski Academy, Bazyli Rudomicz lived.
The next tenement house belonged to the Armenian merchant, Gabriel Bartoszewicz and until today it is called Under the Angel House, because the Archengel Gabriel embellishes the façade in a form of a bas-relief.
The names of these buildings are derived from the ornaments places on the façades of the tenement houses. Next 4 buildings were built by Armenians as well.  The last tenement house of the east wall of the Great Market has an extraordinary history. It is called Rektorska Pharmacy, which was built by a pharmacist. The building had many owners and each of them was a pharmacist. In front of the town hall, on the south wall of the building there are four houses: Paul House, Kinast House, Bern House and the Telanowska House built by Morando for his countryman.
The west side starts with the two Greek Houses. On the left side of the Town Hall there are two tenant houses with the arcades, which gained their common façade in the 19th century.

History of Jews in Zamość

The city was a large center of Chasidic Judaism. The Qahal of Zamość was founded in 1588 when Jan Zamoyski agreed to settle the Jews in the city. The first Jewish settlers were mainly the Sephardi Jews coming from Italy, Spain, Portugal and Turkey. In the 17th century, the newcomers were recruited among the Ashkenazi Jews that soon constituted the majority of the Jewish population. The settlement rights given by Jan Zamoyski were re-confirmed in 1684 by Marcin Zamoyski, the fourth Ordynat of Zamość estate.

At the turn of the 18th and 19th centuries, the Jewish inhabitants were influenced by the Jewish Enlightenment, or Haskalah. The late 19th century saw the spread of Hasidic Judaism. In Zamość there was a Jewish synagogue, two houses of worship and a hospital. The best preserved remnant of the Jewish community is the Zamość Synagogue.

The Synagogue is a prominent example of late Polish Renaissance or Mannerist style in harmony with the general urban design. The floor was lowered in order to increase the height of the interior. This was due to restrictions preventing a synagogue being built higher than a church. Beautiful attic crowns the central building. In the main prayer hall there is an original, stony Renaissance gate. Floral motifs including a stylized Tree of Life crowns, and rosettes are also to be found. The walls used to bear very rich paintings and numerous Hebrew inscriptions.

In 1827, 2,874 Jews lived in the city. In 1900, the Jewish population was 7,034 and the Jewish population grew to 9383 (49.3% of the total population) in 1921.

Zamość was the hometown of many prominent Jews, including poet Solomon Ettinger (1799–1855), writer Isaac Leib Peretz (1852–1915), and political activist Rosa Luxemburg (1870–1919).

Before the outbreak of World War II, more than 12,500 Jews lived in Zamość, accounting for 43 percent of its population. In October 1939, the German occupants set up the Judenrat and in the spring of 1942 they set up a ghetto. The secret Polish Council to Aid Jews "Żegota", established by the Polish resistance movement operated in the city. From April to September 1942, around 4,000 Jews were deported to the Bełżec extermination camp.

In October 1942, the Nazis shot 500 Jews, and the remaining 4,000 Jews were deported, via the transfer point in the Izbica Ghetto, to the extermination camp in Bełżec. These Jews were transported in unheated, closed freight train compartments, without any food or water. Although the distance was relatively short, the journey frequently lasted days, and many died en route. Today only 3 Jews live in Zamość.

World War II

In early September 1939, during the German invasion of Poland which started World War II, the Polish government evacuated a portion of the Polish gold reserve from Warsaw to Zamość, and then further southeast to Śniatyn at the Poland-Romania border, from where it was eventually transported via Romania and Turkey to territory controlled by Polish-allied France. During the invasion Zamość was seized by the German army. Shortly, the Nazis created an extermination camp in the Zamość Rotunda where more than 8,000 people were killed, including displaced residents of the Zamość region and Soviet prisoners of war.

In 1942, Zamość County, due to its fertile black soil, was chosen for further German colonization in the General Government as part of Generalplan Ost. The city itself was initially to be renamed "Himmlerstadt" (Himmler City), later changed to "Pflugstadt" (Plough City). Reichsfuhrer Himmler visited Zamość in August 1942 and ordered that the buildings of the old city be demolished immediately and replaced by a "German town". The local German administrator, more sympathetic towards the town's Renaissance architecture, played for time by requesting what sort of German architecture was required. Teams of planners and architects had not reached a decision when the Germans were evicted by the Red Army.

The German occupiers had planned the relocation of at least 60,000 ethnic Germans in the area before the end of 1943. Before that, a "test trial" expulsion was performed in November 1941, and the whole operation ended in a pacification operation, combined with expulsions in June/July 1943 which was code named Wehrwolf Action I and II. Around 110,000 people from 297 villages were expelled. Around 30,000 victims were children who, if racially "clean" (i.e. had physical characteristics deemed "Germanic") were kidnapped and planned for Germanisation in German families in the Third Reich. Most of the people expelled were sent as slave labour in Germany or to concentration camps.

Local people resisted the action with great determination; they escaped into forests, organised self-defence, helped people who were expelled, and bribed kidnapped children out of German hands. Until the middle of 1943, the Germans managed to settle 80,000 colonists, the number increased by a couple of  thousand more in 1944. This settlement was met with fierce armed resistance by Polish Underground forces (see Zamość Uprising).  The Nazis found it difficult to find many families suitable for Germanization and so settlement, and that those settlers they did find often fled in fear, because those evicted would burn down houses or kill their inhabitants.

The former President of Germany Horst Köhler was born to a family of German colonists in Skierbieszów.

After the war

After World War II, Zamość started a period of development. In the 1970s and 1980s the population grew rapidly (from 39,100 in 1975 to 68,800 in 2003), as the city started to gain significant profits from the old trade routes linking Germany with Ukraine and the ports on the Black Sea.

During the years 1975–1998 Zamość was the capital of Zamość Voivodeship.

References

Bibliography
Herbst, Stanisław. Zamość. Budownictwo i Architektura, 1954.
Kędziora, Andrzej. Encyklopedia miasta Zamościa. Wyd. 2, JN Profil i GREENart Jacek Kardasz, 2012.
Kozakiewicz, Helena, Stefan. Renesans w Polsce. Arkady  1984. 
Ostrowski, Wacław. Wprowadzenie do  historii budowy miast. Warszawa 2001.
Pawlicki, Bonawentura Maciej. Kamienice mieszczańskie Zamościa : problemy ochrony. Kraków 1999.
Słodczyk, Janusz. Historia planowania i budowy miast. Opole 2012.
Tołwiński, Tadeusz. Urbanistyka tom 1 - budowa miasta w przeszłości. Wyd. 3, Wydawnictwo Ministerstwa Odbudowy nr 11, 1948.
Witusik, Adam Andrzej. O Zamoyskich, Zamościu i akademii zamojskiej. Lublin 1978.